The Académie Horlogère des Créateurs Indépendants (AHCI, English: "Academy of Independent Creators in Watchmaking") is a non-profit association, founded in 1985 by Svend Andersen and Vincent Calabrese under Swiss civil law. Its mission was to perpetuate the art of independent watch- and clock-making. The AHCI is based in Zürich.

The AHCI is an international institution with 34 Members, 7 honorary members and 6 candidates from over 12 countries.

Goal, membership and elements

Goal of the association 

 Promote innovation and skills in watchmaking
 Union of talents to get more presence in the public
 Create recognition for the members

The AHCI also gives the members and the candidates the chance to participate in joint exhibitions.

Membership 
The following conditions are needed to become a member:

 Skills in watchmaking
 Independently develops and produces their creations 
 The support of two fellow members 
 The candidate has to show his pieces in at least 3 public shows
 The duration of the candidature is at least two years
 The general assembly of the AHCI has to approve the new member unanimously

The candidate doesn't need to be a watchmaker by profession. Many famous historical watchmakers has been autodidact (like John Harrison or George Daniels). For this reason the AHCI has members which are scientists or engineers.
Only the skills count.

Elements 
The central element is the general assembly. The members meets twice a year, in spring at BaselWorld and in autumn at a central meeting location.

Members 
The most famous members are the founders and the honorary members George Daniels, Jean Kazes and Peter Schmid. The following members are part of the executive board: Becsei, Eszter; Bray, Robert; Candaux, David; Chaykin, Konstantin; Lederer, Bernhard; Rigotto, Alessandro.

Members 
Andersen, Svend;
Andersen, Søren; Asaoka, Hajime;
Baumgartner, Felix;
Becsei, Aaron;
Bray, Robert;
Calabrese, Vincent;
Chaykin, Konstantin;
Valerii Danevych;
Delaloye, Nicolas;
Dufour, Philippe;
Eleta, Miki;
Paul Gerber;
Haldimann, Beat;
Halter, Vianney;
Jenni, Marc;
Journe, François-Paul;
Jutzi, Frank;
Kikuno, Masahiro;
Klings, Christian;
Lang, Marco;
Lederer, Bernhard;
Ma, Xushu;
McGonigle, John;
Naeschke, Sebastian;
Nienaber, Rainer;
Pita, Aniceto;
Prescher, Thomas;
Preziuso, Antoine;
Seryn, Luděk;
Speake-Marin, Peter;
Strehler, Andreas;
Voutilainen, Kari;
Vyskocil, Volker;
Wurtz, Philippe

Honorary members 
Daniels, George;
Kazes, Jean;
Naeschke, Matthias;
Schmid, Peter;
Snétivy, Joseph;
Tai Yu, Kiu;
Van der Klaauw, Christian;
Wibmer, Peter;

References 

 Chronos Spezial – AHCI-Trends – Die Kreativen von Basel..Basel / Genf 2000..S. 115 ff.
 20 years / 1985–2005 / AHCI – Académie Horlogères Créateurs Indépendants
 Auszüge aus den Statuten der AHCI
 Uhren-Magazin Juni-Ausgabe (Heft 6-2006) S. 34 ff.
 Klassik Uhren – Die Einzelkämpfer – Juni/Juli 2004 S. 28 ff.
 Chronos – Die Unabhängigen – Die AHCI auf der Baselworld – 4/2005 S. 44 ff.
 iW – Chrono Anachronists – Ausstellung in Dresden – Februar 2008 S. 56 ff.

links 
 Webauftritt der AHCI
 Unruh-Stifter, Manager Magazin, July 2004
 20th anniversary of the AHCI, Ian Skellern – march 2006

Horological organizations